Lawrence N. "Larry" Seilhamer Rodríguez (born December 13, 1954) is a Puerto Rican politician who was the Secretary of State of Puerto Rico. He is affiliated with the pro-statehood New Progressive Party (PNP), and was a member of the Senate of Puerto Rico from January 7, 2009 until January 15, 2020. Seilhamer is also a former basketball player for the Baloncesto Superior Nacional from 1972 to 1984. On December 2, 2020, he was nominated as Puerto Rico Secretary of State by Governor-elect Pedro R. Pierluisi.

Early years and education

Seilhamer Rodríguez was born in New York City on December 13, 1954. His parents were George Seilhamer and Isabel Rodríguez, and he is the youngest of four children. Seilhamer was raised in Ponce, Puerto Rico, where he studied his elementary and high school at the Santa María Academy.

In 1976, Seilhamer received his bachelor's degree in civil engineering from the University of New Haven, graduating cum laude. In 1979, he completed a second bachelor's degree in Science, with a concentration in Pre-medicine, from the University of Puerto Rico at Mayagüez. In 1983, Seilhamer joined the College of Engineers and Surveyors of Puerto Rico as a licensed engineer.

Sports career
During his time in college, Seilhamer was part of the basketball team of the University of New Haven. When he was 17 years old, he also joined the Baloncesto Superior Nacional league, as a member of the Leones de Ponce. After playing for the Indios de Canóvanas and the Vaqueros de Bayamón, he retired in 1984. During his 1980 season with Canóvanas, Seilhamer averaged 13.5 points per game.

Seilhamer is also a tennis player, and represented Puerto Rico in several tournaments. In 2001 and 2004, Seilhamer was owner of the Leonas de Ponce female volleyball team.

BSN player statistics

|-
| align="left" | 1972
| align="left" | Ponce
| 5 || .423 || - || .400 || 2.2 || 1.0 || 5.2
|-
| align="left" | 1973
| align="left" | Ponce
| 28 || .406 || - || .708 || 1.4 || 0.5 || 7.0
|-
| align="left" | 1974
| align="left" | Ponce
| 28 || .339 || - || .553 || 1.2 || 0.4 || 3.5
|-
| align="left" | 1975
| align="left" | Ponce
| 29 || .455 || - || .673 || 2.6 || 0.6 || 7.4
|-
| align="left" | 1976
| align="left" | Ponce
| 31 || .431 || - || .627 || 3.3 || 0.8 || 7.2
|-
| align="left" | 1977
| align="left" | Ponce
| 31 || .419 || - || .667 || 1.8 || 1.1 || 6.5
|-
| align="left" | 1978
| align="left" | Ponce
| 29 || .478 || - || .661 || 2.3 || 2.2 || 10.9
|-
| align="left" | 1979
| align="left" | Canóvanas
| 26 || .497 || - || .621 || 2.2 || 0.9 || 7.8
|-
| align="left" | 1980
| align="left" | Canóvanas
| 30 || .500 || - || .723 || 2.3 || 1.4 || 13.5
|-
| align="left" | 1981
| align="left" | Ponce
| 32 || .545 || .000 || .723 || 2.8 || 1.5 || 13.3
|-
| align="left" | 1982
| align="left" | Ponce
| 22 || .369 || - || .615 || 1.4 || 0.6 || 4.2
|-
| align="left" | 1983
| align="left" | Bayamón
| 29 || .432 || .500 || .667 || 1.6 || 1.0 || 6.5
|-
| align="left" | 1984
| align="left" | Bayamón
| 21 || .402 || .286 || .750 || 0.6 || 0.6 || 4.6
|-
| align="left" | Career
| align="left" |
| 341 || .456 || .294 || .666 || 2.0 || 1.0 || 7.9

Political career

As part of his political career, Seilhamer worked for the Autonomous Municipality of Ponce as Director of Budget and Planning Operations, as well as Director of Housing and Urban Development. More recently he was the president of Southern Consultants and Engineers, an engineering and surveying company based in Ponce.

In February 2007, Seilhamer decided to participate in the primaries of his party for the Senate of Puerto Rico. On March 9, 2008, he received the most votes for the position of Senator for the District of Ponce. On November 4, 2008, he was elected as Senator at the general elections, being the first time the New Progressive Party had won that district in 16 years.

Seilhamer was elected to the Puerto Rico Senate on November 4, 2008 representing the District of Ponce. In the Senate, he is the chairman of the Urban and Infrastructure Committee. In addition, his fellow senators chose him to serve as the Senate Majority Whip for the 2009–2012 term, making him the fourth highest-ranking member of the Puerto Rico Senate.

In August, 2011, Seilhamer became Senate Majority Leader, after he was chosen to fill the vacancy left by Roberto Arango. He also became chairman of the Comisión de Reglas y Calendario (English: Rules and Scheduling Committee). He is also President of the Special Commission for the Puerto de las Américas.

Re-election

On 20 March 2011, he announced his intention not to seek another term as Senator for the District of Ponce, deciding to run for a Senator At-large seat. This came as a result of the failure of a Senate bill, which he had authored, which would have ordered the Puerto Rico Buildings Authority to build a new vocational school in Ponce to replace the 60-year-old Escuela Superior Vocacional Bernardino Cordero Bernard.

On August 16, 2011, Seilhamer confirmed that he would seek reelection to the Senate in 2012, this time as a Senator At-large, and that he wouldn't challenge María "Mayita" Meléndez for Mayor of Ponce. During the 2012 general elections, Seilhamer was reelected despite the defeat of his party in most of the other seats. In addition, he was selected as the Minority Leader for the NPP delegation starting January 2, 2013.

On June 5, 2016 he was renominated for a second term as a senator at-large and for a third term as a member of the Senate.

On January 13, 2020, he resigned from the Senate effective January 15, 2020 citing his desire to spend more time with family, who lived in the southern city of Ponce and in the United States. His resignation was "irrevocable, final, and firm."

Personal life
Seilhamer has four children with Linda Anadon. Their names are Dennis, David, Desiree and Debora. Debora (born on 1985) played for the USC Trojans volleyball team of the University of Southern California. She and her sister Desirée also played in the Puerto Rico Professional Volleyball League.

References

External links

Hon. Larry Seilhamer on SenadoPR

|-

|-

1954 births
Baloncesto Superior Nacional players
Leones de Ponce basketball players
Living people
Members of the Senate of Puerto Rico
New Progressive Party (Puerto Rico) politicians
Politicians from Ponce
Presidents pro tempore of the Senate of Puerto Rico
Puerto Rican men's basketball players
Puerto Rican people of German descent
Puerto Rican Roman Catholics
Secretaries of State of Puerto Rico
University of New Haven alumni
University of Puerto Rico at Mayagüez